Jalalabad (also Romanized as Jalālābād) is a village in Chenarud-e Jonubi Rural District, Chenarud District, Chadegan County, Isfahan Province, Iran. As of the 2006 census, its population was 112, in 19 families.

References 

Populated places in Chadegan County